Daniel Sobotka (born August 15, 1992) is a Czech professional ice hockey player. He made his Czech Extraliga debut with HC Sparta Praha during the 2010–11 Czech Extraliga postseason.

References

External links

1992 births
Czech ice hockey defencemen
HC Sparta Praha players
Living people
Mississippi RiverKings (SPHL) players
St. Charles Chill players
Macon Mayhem players
HC Berounští Medvědi players
HC Benátky nad Jizerou players
Ice hockey people from Prague
HC Stadion Litoměřice players
Czech expatriate ice hockey players in the United States